was a Japanese fashion designer living in France. He founded Kenzo, a worldwide clothing brand, that also markets skin care and perfumes, Takada was the honorary president of the Asian Couture Federation.

Early life
Takada was born on 27 February 1939 in Himeji, Hyōgo Prefecture. He was one of seven children of Kenji and Shizu Takada, who ran a hotel. His love for fashion developed at an early age, particularly through reading his sisters' magazines. In 1957, he briefly attended Kobe City University of Foreign Studies. However, after his father died during Takada's first year at university, he withdrew from the program against his family's wishes. In 1958, he enrolled at Tokyo's Bunka Fashion College, which had then just opened its doors to male students. During his time at Bunka, Takada won a fashion design competition, the Soen Award, in 1961. At this time, Takada gained experience working in the Sanai department store, where he designed up to 40 outfits a month as a girl's clothing designer.

Takada was inspired by Paris, especially designer Yves Saint Laurent. His interest in Paris was further fostered by his teacher at Bunka, Chie Koike, who was educated at L'École de la Chambre Syndicale de la Couture Parisienne. In preparation for the 1964 Summer Olympics, the government demolished Takada's apartment in 1964, providing him with some monetary compensation. Under the advice of his mentor, and using his compensation money, Takada went on a month-long trip by boat to Paris, stopping along the way at various cities like Hong Kong, Saigon, Mumbai, and Marseille. He ultimately arrived at the Gare de Lyon train station on 1 January 1965. Takada's first impression of Paris was that it was "dismal and bleak", but began to warm to the city when his taxi took him past the Notre Dame de Paris, which he described as "magnificent".

Fashion career

Takada initially struggled in Paris, selling sketches of designs to fashion houses for  each. He had intended to leave Paris for Japan after a few months, but vowed not to do so until he had created something there, as he was determined to open a boutique fashion house in an area where his peers had not opened one. During this time, Takada worked as a stylist at a textile manufacturer named Pisanti.

In 1970, while at a flea market, Takada met a woman who wanted to rent out a small space in the Galerie Vivienne to him cheaply. Takada accepted the offer, and opened up shop as a designer. With very little money to work with, he mixed and matched $200 in fabrics from the Saint Pierre market in Montmartre, creating an eclectic and bold first fashion collection. Takada presented the collection at his first fashion show at the Galerie Vivienne. With no money to afford professional fashion models for the event, Takada and his friends opted to paint the pimples of an acne-covered model green.

Inspired by painter Henri Rousseau, and in particular The Dream, Takada painted the interior of his shop with a jungle-like floral aesthetic. Wanting to combine the jungle aesthetic with his homeland, the designer decided to name his first store "Jungle Jap". The store's name did not go without controversy: in 1971, the Japanese American Citizens League issued a summons to Takada while on his first visit to the United States, challenging him to remove the word "Jap" from his business's name. However, the State supreme court upheld the ability to use the term as part of a trademark the following year. Takada and his team opted to rename the brand once Takada returned to France.

Takada's efforts paid off quickly – in June 1970, Elle featured one of his designs on its cover. He moved locations from the Galerie Vivienne to the Passage Choiseul in 1970. Takada's collection was presented in New York City and Tokyo in 1971. The next year, he won the Fashion Editor Club of Japan'''s prize. In 1973-74, he made perhaps his biggest mark on fashion by leading a silhouette change, loosening and increasing the volume of the popular peasant styles of the time to create what came to be called the "Big Look," with "big" meaning voluminous, soon to become the main high fashion trend of the mid-1970s, a period during which he was cited as originating a number of major trends. In October 1976, Takada opened his flagship store, Kenzo, in the Place des Victoires. Takada proved his sense of dramatic appearance when, in 1978 and 1979, he held his shows in a circus tent, finishing with horsewomen performers wearing transparent uniforms and he himself riding an elephant. Takada even had the chance to direct a film called Yume, yume no ato, which was released in 1981.

Takada's business flourished into the 1980s. Takada's first men's collection was launched in 1983. In August 1984, The Limited Stores announced that they had signed Takada to design a less-expensive clothing line called Album by Kenzo. A children's line called Kenzo Jungle, as well as men's and women's jeans, was released in 1986.

Takada also made ventures into the perfume business. He first experimented with perfumes by releasing King Kong in 1980, which he created "just for fun". In 1988, his women's perfume line began with Kenzo de Kenzo (now known as Ça Sent Beau), Parfum d'été, Le monde est beau, and L'eau par Kenzo. Kenzo pour Homme  was his first men's perfume (1991).  FlowerbyKenzo, launched in 2000, was listed by Vogue's website as one of the best classic French perfumes of all time. In 2001, a skincare line, KenzoKI was also launched.

Since 1993 the brand Kenzo is owned by the French luxury goods company LVMH.
In 2016, he created a perfume for Avon.

Retirement from and subsequent activity in the fashion industry

Takada announced his retirement in 1999 to pursue a career in art, leaving Roy Krejberg and Gilles Rosier to handle the design of Kenzo's men's and women's clothing, respectively. However, in 2005 he reappeared as a decoration designer presenting Gokan Kobo (五感工房 "workshop of the five senses"), a brand of tableware, home objects, and furniture. After a few years off, he wanted to take a new direction, stating "when I stopped working five years ago, I went on vacation, I rested, I traveled. And when I decided to work again, I told myself it would be in decoration, more than fashion." Additionally, in 2013 Kenzo joined the Asian Couture Federation as the organisation's inaugural Honorary President. In 2010 Kenzo's paintings were the subject of a one-man exhibition in Paris titled "Un Certain Style de Vie", A Certain Way of Life".

Takada was made a Knight of the Legion of Honour on 2 June 2016. He was further honored by a Lifetime Achievement Award at the 55th Fashion Editors' Club of Japan Awards in 2017. That same year, Takada unveiled a new collection with Roche Bobois, giving its Mah Jong sofa new upholstery and creating a line of ceramics. Following his departure from the fashion industry, Takada occasionally ventured back into fashion. In  2019 he designed costumes for a production of Madama Butterfly'' by the Tokyo Nikikai Opera Foundation. He also used his eye for design in other ways, collaborating with the Mandarin Oriental Jumeira in Dubai to design the hotel's first publicly-displayed Christmas tree during the 2019 holiday season.

In January 2020, Takada announced that he would be launching a new lifestyle brand named K3. The brand made its first appearance on 17 January 2020 at the Maison et Objet trade show, as well as in a Parisian showroom.

Personal life and death
Takada was in a relationship with French architect Xavier de Castella, who died in August 1990 from an AIDS-related illness. De Castella helped design Takada's  Japanese-style house, which started construction in 1987 and was completed in 1993.

Takada died on 4 October 2020 from complications from COVID-19 while hospitalized at the American Hospital of Paris in Neuilly-sur-Seine during the COVID-19 pandemic in France. He was 81 years old.

Awards 
 France: Ordre des Arts et des Lettres / Chevalier, 1984
 Japan: Medals of Honor / Medal with Purple Ribbon, 1999
 France: Legion of Honour / Chevalier, 2016

References

External links 

Official website of the Kenzo brand

1939 births
2020 deaths
Deaths from the COVID-19 pandemic in France
Japanese fashion designers
Chevaliers of the Ordre des Arts et des Lettres
People from Himeji, Hyōgo
People from Hyōgo Prefecture
Fashion designers from Paris
Japanese emigrants to France
LGBT fashion designers
Japanese LGBT people